Phyllidiella annulata is a species of sea slug, a dorid nudibranch, a shell-less marine gastropod mollusk in the family Phyllidiidae.

Description
Phyllidiella annulata can reach a length of 30–37 mm. It shows a distinctive dorsal pattern usually consisting of a black background with various rings of small bright pink tubercles with black spots in the centre. This species lacks compound tubercles, tubercular clusters and ridges of tubercles.

Habitat
It occurs on shallow coral reefs and rubble, at a depth of about 15 m.

Distribution
This species was described from Lord Hood's Island, Pacific Ocean. It has been reported from the Red Sea, in the tropical Indian Ocean and in central-western Pacific Ocean.

Bibliography 
 Gary R. McDonald, University of California Santa Cruz - Nudibranch Systematic Index
 Brunckhorst, D.J. (1993) The systematics and phylogeny of Phyllidiid Nudibranchs (Doridoidea). Records of the Australian Museum, Supplement 16: 1-107.

References

External links 
 Nudipixel
 Geodia

Phyllidiidae
Gastropods described in 1853
Taxa named by John Edward Gray